8:18 is the fifth studio album by American metalcore band The Devil Wears Prada. The album was released on September 17, 2013, through Roadrunner Records. It is the first album without founding keyboardist James Baney, and the final album with founding members Chris Rubey and Daniel Williams. It topped the Christian charts and came in at No. 20 and No. 6 on the Billboard 200 and rock charts respectively, selling 16,000 copies in the first week.

Composition
The band maintains their metalcore sound throughout the album, although the track "Care More" has industrial influence. Artist Direct has also noted sounds influenced by hardcore punk and heavy metal, and Ultimate Guitar described the album as melodic metalcore.

Critical reception

At Alternative Press, Scott Heisel proclaimed it to be an excellently "solid record". At HM, they affirmed this was "a refreshing work of self-awareness". Alternative Press premiered the album in its entirety via their website on September 10, 2013 to promote the release. Allmusic'''s Jason Lymangrover said the songs were "more visceral and accomplished than prior outings" and called the title track, Care More, and In Heart as the Allmusic track picks.

Commercial performance
The album was also released in high resolution (48 kHz/24bit) on HDtracks.com.
In its first week of release, the album debuted at No. 20 on the Billboard 200, No. 1 on Top Christian Albums chart and No. 6 on the Top Rock Albums chart, selling 16,000 copies.  It also came in at No. 2 on the hard rock charts behind Avenged Sevenfold's Hail to the King. In its second week, the album fell to No. 105 on the Billboard'' 200, selling 3,000 copies and its third week, the album fell to No. 169 and sold 2,000 copies.  As of October 2016, the album has sold 50,000 copies in the US.

Track listing

Personnel

The Devil Wears Prada
Daniel Williams – drums
Andy Trick – bass guitar
Chris Rubey – lead guitar, backing vocals
Jeremy DePoyster – clean vocals, rhythm guitar, lead vocals and piano on "Care More"
Mike Hranica – lead vocals, additional guitars

Production
Produced by Matt Goldman & Adam Dutkiewicz, at Glow in the Dark Dark Studios, Atlanta, Georgia and Zing Studios, Westfield, Massachusetts
Engineered by Matt Goldman & Matt McClellan
Mixed by Dan Korneff
Mastered by Ted Jensen
Keyboards and synthesizer by Jonathan Gering
A&R by Dave Rath
Management by Chris Brown, Randy Dease, Mark Mercado & John Youngman (Fly South Music Group)
Booking by Dave Shapiro & Tom Taaffe (The Agency Group)
Art direction by Mike Hranica
Design & layout by Micah Sedmak
Cover art & photo by Daniel Hojnacki

Charts

References

2013 albums
Roadrunner Records albums
The Devil Wears Prada (band) albums
Albums produced by Matt Goldman
Albums produced by Adam Dutkiewicz